Milks may refer to:

 Hib Milks (1899–1949), Canadian professional ice hockey forward
 Milk, nutrient-rich liquids secreted by the mammary glands of female mammals